Kuttiady State assembly constituency is one of the 140 state legislative assembly constituencies in Kerala state in southern India.  It is also one of the 7 state legislative assembly constituencies included in the Vatakara Lok Sabha constituency.
 As of the 2021 assembly elections, the current MLA is K. P. Kunhammed Kutti of CPI (M).

Local self-governed segments
7 out of the 8 local bodies included in the current Kuttiady constituency were parts of the erstwhile Meppayur constituency before 2008 delimitation. Kuttiady Niyamasabha constituency is composed of the following local self governed segments:

Members of Legislative Assembly 
The following list contains all members of Kerala legislative assembly who have represented the constituency:

Key

Election history 
Niyamasabha Election 2021

There were 2,02,211 registered voters in the constituency for the 2021 election.

 In 2021, Kuttiadi legislative assembly constituency had a total of 2,02,211 electors. Total number of polled votes was 1,64,404. Communist Party Of India (Marxist) candidate K. P. Kunhammed Kutti won and became MLA from this seat. He secured a total of 80,143 votes. Indian Union Muslim League  candidate Parakkal Abdulla stood second with a total of 79,810 votes. He lost by 333 votes.

Niyamasabha Election 2016 
There were 1,84,610 registered voters in the constituency for the 2016 election.

 In 2016, Kuttiadi legislative assembly constituency had total 1,84,610 electors. Total number of valid votes was 1,57,810. Indian Union Muslim League candidate Parakkal Abdulla won and became MLA from this seat. He secured total 71,809 votes. Communist Party Of India (Marxist) candidate K. K. Lathika stood second with total 70,652 votes. She lost by 1,157 votes.

Niyamasabha Election 2011 
There were 1,62,389 registered voters in the constituency for the 2011 election.

 In 2011, Kuttiadi legislative assembly constituency had total 1,62,389 electors. The total number of the valid votes was 1,42,453. Communist Party Of India (Marxist) candidate K. K. Lathika won and became MLA from this seat. She secured total of 70,258 votes. Muslim League Kerala State Committee candidate Sooppy Narikkatteri stood second with total of 63,286 votes. He lost by 6,972 votes.

See also 
 Kuttiady
 Meppayur (State Assembly constituency)
 Kozhikode district
 List of constituencies of the Kerala Legislative Assembly
 2016 Kerala Legislative Assembly election

References 

Assembly constituencies of Kerala

State assembly constituencies in Kozhikode district